Bonelli is an Italian surname. Notable people with the surname include:

 Antonia Paula de la Resurreccion Bonelly (1786–1870), colonial woman of East Florida
 Aurelio Bonelli (c.1569 – after 1620), Italian composer, organist and painter
 Camillo Bonelli, Captain Regent of San Marino
 Carlo Bonelli (1612–1676), Italian cardinal
 Eduardo Iturrizaga Bonelli (born 1989), Venezuelan chess player
 Ernie Bonelli (1919-2009), American football player 
 Federico Bonelli, Italian ballet dancer
 Franco Andrea Bonelli (1784–1830), Italian zoologist
 Frank G. Bonelli (1906–1972), Los Angeles County Supervisor
 Gian Luigi Bonelli (1908–2001), Italian comics writer
 Innocenzo Bonelli, Captain-General of San Marino
 Jim Bonelli (1884–1918), Australian rules footballer
 Luigi Bonelli (1892–1954), Italian playwright and screenwriter
 Maria Luisa Righini-Bonelli (1917–1981), Italian science historian and educator
 Michele Bonelli (1541–1598), Italian cardinal
 Olivia Bonelli (1920–1990), American soprano
 Raphael M. Bonelli, Austrian psychiatrist and researcher
 Richard Bonelli, American baritone
 Sergio Bonelli (1932–2011), Italian comics writer
 William G. Bonelli (1895–1970), U.S. politician

See also
 Bonelli Landing, Lake Mead
 Matthew Bonnellus (Matteo Bonello), 12th century Norman knight in Sicily

Italian-language surnames